This is a list of fellows of the Royal Society elected in 2000.

Fellows

Michael Edwin Akam (born 1952), zoologist 
James Jeffrey Binney (born 1950), astrophysicist
Brice Bosnich (1936–2015), Australian inorganic chemist
Cyrus Chothia (1942–2019), molecular biologist
Peter Cresswell, immunologist
Alan Davison (1936–2015),  inorganic chemist
John Douglas Denton, physicist 
Warren John Ewens (born 1937) Australian mathematician 
Michael John Robert Fasham  (1942–2008), oceanographer 
Michael Anthony John Ferguson (born 1957), biochemist 
Christopher Donald Frith (born 1942), psychologist 
Michel Goedert,  neuroscientist 
Donald Grierson (born 1945), geneticist
Peter Gavin Hall (born 1951), Australian mathematician
Alexander Norman Halliday (born 1952), geochemist
Andrew Bruce Holmes (born 1943), Australian and British chemist
Roy Jackson, fluid dynamicist
Bruce Arthur Joyce, materials physicist
Simon Barry Laughlin, neurobiologist 
Peter Francis Leadlay
Anthony Charles Legon, physical chemist 
Robert Glanville Lloyd
Robert Sinclair MacKay (born 1956), mathematician 
Sir John Maddox (1925–2009) science writer, former editor of Nature (Honorary)
Thomas John Martin
Kiyoshi Nagai (1949–2019), structural biologist 
Stuart Stephen Papworth Parkin (born 1955), physicist
Ole Holger Petersen (born 1943), physiologist 
Madabusi Santanam Raghunathan (born 1941), Indian mathematician 
Tiruppattur Venkatachalamurti Ramakrishnan (born 1941), Indian physicist 
Michael Alfred Robb
Janet Rossant (born 1950), developmental biologist 
Patricia Ann Simpson, biologist 
Harry Smith (1935–2015), botanist 
Peter Somogyi (born 1950), neurobiologist
Sir Martin Nicholas Sweeting (born 1951), aerospace engineer 
Brian Douglas Sykes, Biochemist, University of Alberta
James Edgar Till (born 1931), Canadian biophysicist
Paul Kingsley Townsend, physicist
Alan Andrew Watson (born 1938) Scottish physicist
Ian Andrew Wilson, biologist
John Henry Woodhouse
Adrian Frederick George Wyatt, physicist

Foreign members

Grigory Isaakovich Barenblatt (1927–2018), Russian mathematician 
Ronald Breslow (1931–2017), American chemist 
Harry Barkus Gray (born 1935) American Professor of Chemistry
Erwin L Hahn (1921–2016), American physicist 
Martin Karplus (born 1930), Austrian-born American theoretical chemist
Mitsuhiro Yanagida (born 1941), Japanese biologist

References

2000
2000 in science
2000 in the United Kingdom